The 2010 Yas V8 400 was a motor race for the Australian sedan-based V8 Supercars. It was the first race of the 2010 V8 Supercar Championship Series. It was held on the weekend of February 18–20 on Yas Marina Circuit, in Abu Dhabi, United Arab Emirates. It was the first time V8 Supercar visited the circuit and only the fourth time V8 Supercar had visited the Middle-East, having three times previously raced at the Bahrain International Circuit. The two Asian venues were linked together for the 2010 season, causing the cancellation of the 2009 Desert 400 at Bahrain, and the 2010 Desert 400 will take place the week following the Yas V8 400. 

The weekend was dominated by Triple Eight Race Engineering and by reigning champion Jamie Whincup who won both races over the course of the weekend. Team mate Craig Lowndes had a second and fifth, proving that the off-season change from Ford to Holden has been no impediment to their success. Between them on points is leading Ford driver Mark Winterbottom taking a third and a second for the weekend. The other driver to claim a top three finish was Stone Brothers Racing Ford driver Shane van Gisbergen who finished third under pressure in Race 2.

Report

Results
Results as follows:

Race 1

Qualifying

Top Ten Shootout

Race 
After qualifying second, Garth Tander sent to the rear of grid for not having jack stands under the car while crew member were working on the car. Mark Winterbottom won the start of the race ahead of Jamie Whincup, Will Davison, Lee Holdsworth, James Courtney and Alex Davison.

Paul Morris hit and spun Todd Kelly off the track, with Garth Tander getting tangled up as a result.

James Courtney, suffering from clutch problems, tapped the rear of Lee Holdsworth, shoving slightly aside at the chicane. Courtney later moved aside and let Holdsowrth back in front.

Four laps in, race leader Winterbottom was assigned a ten-second penalty for starting outside of his grid box. Whincup took the lead from Winterbottom at turn 1 on lap 8. It was a lead Winterbottom would never regain with Craig Lowndes climbing into second after Winterbottom served his ten-second penalty at his first pitstop.

James Courtney finished in fourth position ahead of Lee Holdsworth and Shane van Gisbergen. Paul Dumbrell drove an excellent race for his new team to finish seventh ahead of V8 Supercar rookie Jonathon Webb after an excellent drive. Alex Davison and Rick Kelly rounded out the top ten.

Holden Racing Team had a poor day with 2009 series runner up Will Davison stopping with engine failure while Garth Tander was disqualified from qualifying for a pitlane infringement. The rear of grid start saw Tander get tangled with other cars during the race leaving the car damaged and he limped home for 26th position after losing four laps.

Race 2

Qualifying

Race 
Paul Morris pulled into the pits before the start of the race. Todd Kelly and Michael Caruso tangled in a chaotic start which also saw Steven Richards spun in front of the field after contact with Tony D'Alberto and contact between Craig Lowndes and Shane van Gisbergen. Alex Davison also completed the lap with a fender bent onto a tyre, forcing a lap one pitstop. The steel cords from the tyre wrapped themselves around the front left suspension causing a long stop.

Jamie Whincup won the start from Garth Tander, Rick Kelly, James Courtney and a slow away polesitter, Mark Winterbottom with a short gap to Lowndes and Van Gisbergen. Van Gisbergen soon fought past Lowndes, the Triple Eight Commodore slowing after the heavy contact on the opening lap and fell into the clutches of Steven Johnson.

Todd Kelly was spun around by Dean Fiore, then later made heavy contact with Daniel Gaunt on lap 18, resulting in a puncture and deranged front right corner of Kelly's Commodore.

Garth Tander pitted on lap 20 after the wheel nut fell off the front left wheel. The hub was damaged returned to the pits and a replacement wheel was not able to be fitted successfully and his car was pushed into the garage to attempt a repair.

Whincup capitalised on a good race start and held the lead for most of the race, winning from Winterbottom who clawed back to second after his poor start. Shane van Gisbergen claimed third after strong race to return Stone Brothers Racing to form after a rebuilding year in 2009. Rick Kelly got the best of Craig Lowndes for fourth position with James Courtney next. Lee Holdsworth took Steven Johnson for seventh on the final lap with Russell Ingall and Jason Bright completing the top ten.

Standings
 After Race 2 of 26

References

External links
Yas V8 400 website
Official timing and results

Yas
Yas V8 400
Motorsport competitions in the United Arab Emirates